(2-Chlorophenyl)thiourea is a chemical compound used as an herbicide. As of 1998, the Environmental Protection Agency did not have it registered as a pesticide in the United States.

References

Herbicides
Thioureas
Chlorobenzenes